Saint Matthew's Church is a parish of the Anglican Diocese of Singapore. Of the 26 Anglican parishes in Singapore, the St Matthew's Church Chinese congregation has the longest history among all the congregations.

History 

St Matthew's Church was founded on 29 September 1902, beginning as a Cantonese-speaking Chinese congregation under St. Peter's Church, Singapore.

Historically, the Neil Road site and the present site were near two of the places used to gather and screen Chinese men aged 18 to 55 for the Sook Ching massacre in 1942: the present Police Cantonment Complex, and the area between Singapore General Hospital and Tiong Bahru Road.

After World War II, a second building was constructed at Neil Road, which expanded to include a kindergarten.

The present building at 1K Eng Hoon Street, Singapore 169796 in Tiong Bahru was dedicated on 7 May 2006 by the John Chew Hiang Chea (周贤正大主教), who is the 3rd Archbishop of the Church of the Province of South East Asia as well as the 9th Bishop of Singapore.

, St Matthew's Church, in her 105th year, has both English and Mandarin congregations.  After about 77 years at Neil Road, the church re-located to Eng Hoon Street in Tiong Bahru in 2006.  Begun as a Cantonese congregation, Chinese Singaporeans are still the majority, although the Cantonese congregation has moved to St. Andrew's Cathedral, Singapore.

The total church population is estimated to be about 400.  There are about 200 English-speaking persons (including English-speaking Chinese) in the English congregation, and about 120 Mandarin-speaking Chinese in the Mandarin congregation.  There are on average 40 youths in the English Youth Service and 20 children in the English Children's Ministry.  The Mandarin Youth Fellowship has 6 youth and the Mandarin Children's Ministry an average attendance of 9 children.

References 

 Directory of Churches in The Diocese of Singapore website
 National Council of Churches of Singapore, "A Guide To Churches & Christian Organisations in Singapore 2005-2006", page 15
 "St Matthew's 100" (St Matthew's Church Annual, 2002)
 "St Matthew's Church 98th Anniversary" (St Matthew's Church Annual, Sep 2000)

External links 

 Information Board on St Matthew's Church

Churches in Singapore
Anglican church buildings in Singapore